The 100 metres sprint has been one of original track events in the Summer Paralympics since 1968. The first track events were for male wheelchair competitors only (female wheelchair competitors took part in 60m sprints in that year, they took part in the 100m sprint in 1976). Able-bodied athletes took part in track events in 1976.

Men's medal summaries

Ambulant athletes

Amputee athletes

Blind athletes

Wheelchair athletes

Women's medal summaries

Ambulant athletes

Amputee athletes

Blind athletes

Wheelchair athletes

See also
Athletics at the Olympics
100 metres at the Olympics

References

medalists
100 metres at the Paralympics
Paralympic medalists in athletics (track and field)